Photo paper may refer to:

 Photographic paper, paper coated with light-sensitive chemicals, used for making photographic prints
 Inkjet paper designed for high-quality photographic prints when used in a suitable inkjet printer